The iPhone 13 and iPhone 13 Mini (stylized as iPhone 13 mini) are smartphones designed, developed, marketed, and sold by Apple Inc. They are the fifteenth generation of iPhones (succeeding the iPhone 12 and iPhone 12 Mini respectively). They were unveiled at an Apple Event in Apple Park in Cupertino, California on September 21, 2021, alongside the higher-priced iPhone 13 Pro and iPhone 13 Pro Max flagships. Pre-orders for the iPhone 13 and iPhone 13 Mini began on September 17, 2021. They were officially released on September 24, 2021.

History 
The iPhone 13 and iPhone 13 Mini were officially announced alongside the ninth-generation iPad, 6th generation iPad Mini, Apple Watch Series 7, iPhone 13 Pro, and iPhone 13 Pro Max by a virtual press event filmed and recorded at Apple Park in Cupertino, California on September 14, 2021. Pre-orders began on September 17 2021 at 5:00 AM PDT. Pricing starts at US$799 for the iPhone 13 and US$699 for the iPhone 13 Mini.

Design 
The iPhone 13 has a flat chassis analogous to that of contemporaneous Apple products, some differences such as the rear cameras being larger and arranged diagonally. The Face ID True Depth sensor housing on the iPhone is 20% smaller yet taller than its predecessors.

The iPhone 13 and iPhone 13 Mini are available in six colors: Midnight, Starlight, Product Red, Blue, Pink, and Green.

On March 8, 2022, at Apple's Special Event "Peek Performance", Apple revealed a new Green color option, which became available and released on March 18, 2022.

Specifications

Hardware 
The iPhone 13 and iPhone 13 Mini use an Apple-designed A15 Bionic system on a chip. The iPhone 13 and 13 Mini feature a 6-core CPU, 4-core GPU, and 16-core Neural Engine, while the iPhone 13 Pro and 13 Pro Max feature a 5-core GPU.

Display 
The iPhone 13 features a  display with Super Retina XDR OLED technology at a resolution of 2532×1170 pixels and a pixel density of about 460 PPI with a refresh rate of 60 Hz. The iPhone 13 Mini features a  display with the same technology at a resolution of 2340×1080 pixels and a pixel density of about 476 PPI. Both models have the Super Retina XDR OLED display with improved typical brightness up to 800 nits, and max brightness up to 1200 nits.

Cameras 
The iPhone 13 and 13 Mini feature the same camera system with three cameras: one front-facing camera (12MP f/2.2) and two back-facing cameras: a wide (12MP f/1.6) and ultra-wide (12MP f/2.4) camera. The back-facing cameras both contain larger sensors for more light-gathering with new sensor shift optical image stabilization (OIS) on the main camera. The camera module on the back is arranged diagonally instead of vertically to engineer the larger sensors.

The cameras use Apple's latest computational photography engine, called Smart HDR 4. Users can also choose from a range of photographic styles during capture, including rich contrast, vibrant, warm, and cool. Apple clarifies this is different from a filter because it works intelligently with the image processing algorithm during capture to apply local adjustments to an image and the effects will be baked into the photos, unlike filters which can be removed after applying.

The camera app contains a new mode called Cinematic Mode, which allows users to rack focus between subjects and create (simulate) shallow depth of field using software algorithms. It is supported on wide and front-facing cameras in 1080p at 30 fps.

Software 

iPhone 13 and iPhone 13 Mini were shipped with iOS 15 at launch. They are compatible with iOS 16, which was released on September 12, 2022.

Repairability 
Some iPhone 13 parts are paired to the motherboard. The user is warned if a paired component (e.g. screen, battery) is replaced by independent repair shops, the Face ID sensors may completely cease to function.  On later iOS versions Apple removed this limitation. Apple technicians have a proprietary software tool to pair components.

See also 
 iPhone 13 Pro
 Comparison of smartphones
 History of the iPhone
 List of iOS devices

References

External links 
  – official site

IOS
Mobile phones introduced in 2021
Mobile phones with 4K video recording
Mobile phones with multiple rear cameras
Flagship smartphones